The truncated square antiprism one in an infinite series of truncated antiprisms, constructed as a truncated square antiprism. It has 18 faces, 2 octagons, 8 hexagons, and 8 squares.

Gyroelongated triamond square bicupola
If the hexagons are folded, it can be constructed by regular polygons. Or each folded hexagon can be replaced by two triamonds, adding 8 edges (56), and 4 faces (32). This form is called a gyroelongated triamond square bicupola.

Related polyhedra

Snub square antiprism 
Although it can't be made by all regular planar faces, its alternation is the Johnson solid, the snub square antiprism.

References

 Snub Anti-Prisms

Polyhedra